The Temple of Serapis was an sanctuary in Ancient Rome dedicated to the god Serapis and the goddess Isis.  The temple was founded on an unknown date but known to have existed during the reign of Caracalla. It was known as the most monumental temple of the Quirinal Hill.  In the 4th century, the temple was closed during the persecution of pagans in the late Roman Empire, after which it was torn down and used as building material.

See also
List of Ancient Roman temples

References

Temples on the Quirinal
Temples of Isis
Serapeum
Destroyed temples
Buildings and structures demolished in the 4th century
Persecution of pagans in the late Roman Empire